Béalcourt is a commune in the Somme department in Hauts-de-France in northern France.

Geography
Béalcourt is situated on the D99 road, by the banks of the Authie river, the border of the departments of the Somme and the Pas-de-Calais.

Population

See also
Communes of the Somme department

References

Communes of Somme (department)